The Calgary Flames are a professional ice hockey franchise based in Calgary, Alberta. They play in the Pacific Division of the Western Conference in the National Hockey League (NHL). The franchise was founded in 1972 as the Atlanta Flames, and relocated to Calgary in 1980.  Since arriving in Calgary, the Flames have drafted 378 players. The 2020 draft was the 41st in which Calgary participated.

The NHL Entry Draft is held each June, allowing teams to select players who have turned 18 years old by September 15 in the year the draft is held. The draft order is determined by the previous season's order of finish, with non-playoff teams drafting first, followed by the teams that made the playoffs, with the specific order determined by the number of points earned by each team. Since 2016, the NHL holds a weighted lottery for the 15 non-playoff teams, allowing the winners to move up to the top three selections. From 1995–2012 the winner of the draft lottery was allowed to move up a maximum of four positions in the entry draft. The team with the fewest points has the best chance of winning the lottery, with each successive team given a lower chance of moving up in the draft. The Flames have never won the lottery.  Between 1986 and 1994, the NHL also held a Supplemental Draft for players in American colleges.

Calgary's first draft pick was Denis Cyr, taken 13th overall in the 1980 NHL Entry Draft. The highest that Calgary has drafted is fourth overall, which they have done once, they selected Sam Bennett (2014) at the fourth spot. Ten picks went on to play over 1,000 NHL games: Al MacInnis, Gary Roberts, Paul Ranheim, Brett Hull, Gary Suter, Joe Nieuwendyk, Theoren Fleury, Cory Stillman, Derek Morris and Dion Phaneuf. Three of Calgary's draft picks, MacInnis, Joe Nieuwendyk and Brett Hull have been elected to the Hockey Hall of Fame.  1986 draft pick Tom Quinlan was also drafted by baseball's Toronto Blue Jays and chose a career in Major League Baseball over the NHL.

Key

Draft picks

Statistics are complete as of the 2021–22 NHL season and show each player's career regular season totals in the NHL.  Wins, losses, ties, overtime losses and goals against average apply to goaltenders and are used only for players at that position. This list includes players drafted by the team in Calgary only.

See also
List of Atlanta Flames draft picks
List of NHL first overall draft choices
List of undrafted NHL players with 100 games played

References
General

Draft history: 
Draft history: 
Player stats: 
Player stats: 

Specific

 
draft picks
Calgary Flames